Bob Budiansky (born March 15, 1954) is an American comic book writer, editor, and penciller, best known for his work on Marvel's Transformers comic. He also created the Marvel character Sleepwalker and wrote all 33 issues of that comic.

Early life
Budiansky was born in The Bronx, New York, where he attended public school, then went on to the State University of New York at Buffalo. He was "reintroduced" to comics while in college during the early 1970s. His first published work was Superrunt — a comic strip collaboration with Charles "Sparky" Alzamora, published in the University at Buffalo newspaper The Spectrum while he was a student there.

Career
Budiansky worked at Marvel Comics for approximately 20 years. He is responsible for much of the writing of the original Marvel Transformers comic, and conceived the names of most of the original Transformers, including Decepticon leader Megatron, Autobot medic Ratchet, Starscream, Sideswipe, and the Decepticon Ravage. He also wrote the vast majority of the descriptive "tech spec" biographies printed on the Transformers toy packages that Hasbro produced in the 1980s, giving each figure unique personality traits.

After a long hiatus from the Transformers mythos, Budiansky scripted a new adaptation of the original 1986 The Transformers: The Movie for IDW Publishing in 2006 in honor of the film's 20th anniversary.

Budiansky is also a penciller. He drew the final years of the Johnny Blaze/Zarathos version of Ghost Rider, as well as drawing the majority of Ghost Rider covers from 1978 to 1983 and co-plotting the series with its final writer, J. M. DeMatteis. Following the cancellation of Ghost Rider, Budiansky and DeMatteis continued this method of collaboration in the limited series Prince Namor, the Sub-Mariner. Budiansky recalled, "Marc would typically map out the story arc, discuss it with me, I'd give him feedback, maybe come up with a few extra plot twists and turns, and suggest some scenes that might juice up the story visually. ... Marc had this four-issue story arc more nailed down than some of the Ghost Rider stories we worked on together, so I think I contributed less to the Sub-Mariner plots." Budiansky's covers for Prince Namor are an early example of interlocking covers; when the covers are placed together in two rows, the backgrounds flow into each other.

From 1983 till 1996, Budiansky was on staff at Marvel as an editor. During this period, Budiansky oversaw such titles as Fantastic Four, Daredevil and Spider-Man.

Honors
At BotCon 2010, Hasbro named Budiansky as one of the first four human inductees in the Transformers Hall of Fame for his contributions to the creation of the franchise.

Personal life
Budiansky married Angela Goldman in August 1991. Budiansky has two children: Emma and David.

Partial bibliography

As artist
 Ghost Rider #68-81 (also co-plotter)
 Prince Namor, the Sub-Mariner #1-4 (also co-plotter and cover colorist)

As writer
 The Avengers #204, 205, 207 & 208
 Captain Britain #38 & 39 (UK)
 Ghost Rider #77 - 81
 Marvel Adventures #13
 Marvel Super Special #25
 Sleepwalker #1 - 33 (1991–1994)
 Spider-Man Comics Weekly #231 (UK)
 The Transformers #22 - 28; 33 - 40; 51 - 56; 66 - 73; 174 & 175 (UK)
 Transformers Universe #1 - 4
 The Transformers #1 - 15; 17 - 32; 35 - 42; 44 - 55
 The Transformers: The Movie #1 - 4
 The Transformers: Generations #1 - 3; 4 - 10 & 12
 The Transformers: Headmasters #1 - 4
 Uncanny Origins #7 & 13
 What If? #34
 X-Men And Captain Universe #1

As inker
 Captain Britain #36 (UK)
 Essential Marvel Two-In-One trade paperback volume 3
 Marvel Two-In-One Annual #4
 What If? #34

As colorist
 The Punisher #36 & 42
 Sleepwalker #1 - 3

As letterer
 Spider-Man Adventures #10

Notes

References
 
 "Bullpen Bulletins" "Pro File on: BOB BUDIANSKY," The Incredible Hulk #340 (Feb. 1988)

External links

 Official Representative for commissions
 
 Interview at Transfans.net
 2007 retrospective interview
 Bob Budiansky at the Transformers Wiki

1954 births
Living people
People from the Bronx
University at Buffalo alumni
American comics writers
American comics artists
Artists from the Bronx
Comic book editors